Kyan van Dorp (born 17 May 2000) is a Dutch professional footballer who plays as a goalkeeper for Dutch club Emmen.

Club career
On 25 May 2019, van Korp signed his first professional contract with Jong PSV. He Dorp made his professional debut with Jong PSV in a 3–2 Eerste Divisie win over FC Dordrecht on 11 January 2021.

On 16 July 2021, he joined Emmen on a one-year contract.

References

External links
 
 Kyan van Dorp PSV Profile

2000 births
Living people
People from Nieuwegein
Dutch footballers
Association football goalkeepers
Jong PSV players
FC Emmen players
Eerste Divisie players
Footballers from Utrecht (province)